The Expenditure Review Committee (more commonly known as An Bord Snip) was an advisory committee established by the Irish Government in 1987 to recommend cuts in state spending.

Establishment
The committee was established by the then Taoiseach, Charles Haughey, and the Minister for Finance Ray MacSharry. It was a three-man committee comprising two senior civil servants, Sean Cromien and Bob Curran, and a private sector economist, Colm McCarthy.

Etymology
An Bord Snip was a colloquial, comic term for the body. It is a mix of Irish and English words, literally meaning "the snip board". Many state agencies in Ireland have the words an bord (meaning "the board") in their title, for example Bord Iascaigh Mhara (the Irish Sea-Fisheries Board); "snip" refers to the cost-cutting remit of the group. In 2008 another board with a similar remit was established, referred to as "An Bord Snip Nua". Nua is the Irish word for "new".

See also
Public service of the Republic of Ireland
State-sponsored bodies of Ireland
Economy of the Republic of Ireland

References

Economic history of the Republic of Ireland
1980s in Ireland